Warboys railway station was a railway station in Warboys, Cambridgeshire, which opened in 1889 and closed completely in 1964.

References

External links
 Warboys station on navigable 1946 O. S. map
 Warboys station on Subterranea Britannica

Disused railway stations in Cambridgeshire
Former Great Northern and Great Eastern Joint Railway stations
Railway stations in Great Britain opened in 1889
Railway stations in Great Britain closed in 1930
1889 establishments in England
1930 disestablishments in England